The ÖBB 1014 and 1114 classes are multi system electric locomotives, constructed between 1993 and 1994. The locomotives were designed to operate from Austria, to the Czech Republic, Slovakia, and Hungary.

History 
Following the fall of the iron curtain, the ÖBB needed new locomotives to cope with the increase in international traffic. The 1014 was developed to operate from the Austrian 15 kV AC, 16 2⁄3 Hz electrification, as well as the 25 kV AC, 50 Hz electrification used by ČD and ŽSR.

Withdrawal from the ÖBB 
In 2009 the locomotives were withdrawn and stored, with the ÖBB selling the locomotives at scrap value between 2008 and 2010, with each locomotive sold for 15,000 euros each, compared to the approximately 4 million euros per locomotive originally paid. This drop in value, combined with the short service life of the locomotives, led to criticism of the Federal Railways.

Post ÖBB usage 
Following the withdrawal of the locomotives by the ÖBB in 2009, the locomotives have spent long periods in storage. In 2016, 16 of the locomotives were moved to Romania, although they were not used. In August and September 2018 they returned to Austria, and are now used by Zeller Transport Technik on freight services.

After the bankruptcy of Zeller Transport Technik, four locomotives were shipped to Tanzania in January 2022.

References 

Austrian Federal Railways electric locomotives
Bo′Bo′ locomotives
15 kV AC locomotives
25 kV AC locomotives
Railway locomotives introduced in 1993
Electric locomotives of Austria